The Legend of the Silver Fir is a 1973 Czechoslovak film directed by František Vláčil.

Plot
There is a legend that someone who will do something good, will see Silver trees. Young boy Ondra sees such trees on a painting. The painting shows Silver trees, a man falling down and a Watch hanging from a tree One day a Seed Coater Lojzek comes to Ondra's parents. Ondra's father Slávek is an old friend of Lojzek and used to be Seed Coater too. Lojzek moves in a Cabin in the Mountains and invites Slávek to help him coating. Slávek takes Ondra with him. They show the job to Ondra and he wants to do it too. Slávek has to return home and leaves Ondra with Lojzek. Ondra becomes Lojzek's helper. One day Lojzek met an old Gamekeeper who remembers Lojzek's father Cyril who died while coating Seed from a frozen tree. The painting was made to Cyril's memory. Ondra sees frozen Trees and they seem to him as Silver. He climbs up one of them even though Lojzek wants him to come down. Suddenly branches break and Ondra falls. Lojzek manages o catch him but is injured. His father's watch is broken. He gives it to Ondra and tells him to show it to Slávek. Ondra hurries home and shows the watch to Slávek. Slávek realizes that some accident happened. They hurry to Lojzek. Lojzek doesn't say that his injury is Ondra's fault and Slávek assumes that Lojzek fell off tree. Lojzek then leaves but might return next year. The film ends when Ondra finally sees Silver trees.

Cast
Maroš Kramár as Ondra
Július Vašek as Lojzek Hojgr
Lubomír Kostelka as Slávek
Jana Hliňáková as Jarka
Jiří Hálek as the Teacher
Ladislav Gzela as the Gamekeeper

Reception

Accolades

References

External links
 

1973 films
Czech children's films
Czech drama films
1970s Czech-language films
Czechoslovak drama films
Films directed by František Vláčil